Amalia  Granata (born on 26 February 1981, Rosario) is an Argentine model, journalist and politician. She is a congresswoman of the province of Santa Fe since 2019.

Biography
In mid-2007, she went to live in Romania with his then boyfriend, footballer Cristian Fabbiani. A few months later she returned to Argentina, separated from Fabbiani, of which she was pregnant waiting for a daughter and baptized her with the name of Uma who was born in 2008 in a hospital in Rosario, Argentina.

In February 2016, he began a relationship with businessman Leonardo Squarzon. A month after the courtship, she revealed that she was pregnant and Roque was born in December, the couple was about to separate since Squarzon was unfaithful but in the end they were able to overcome the crisis.

Career
She began his television career in a media way as she went to a program and confessed to having had sex with Robbie Williams when he was on tour with his 2003 Tour of Argentina in November 2004.

Granata worked during the Viña del Mar 2006 Festival as a TV show host. In that same year, he participated in a segment called MisionSex of the Chilean REC program and made several light photo sessions of clothes for Chilean magazines and portals.

In May 2007 he joined the reality show of Hermano Famosos of the Argentine television channel Telefe, proving to be the first expelled from the game with 54% of the votes.

Between 2009 and 2010 she was a panelist for the program A Perfect World and posed totally naked for the Argentine edition of Playboy magazine. He was also in the sixth edition of the Argentine tournament called Bailando 2010, from which he eliminated couples like those of Zaira Nara and Belén Francese.

During 2017 and currently she works as a panelist in Pamela in the afternoon led by Pamela David.13 14 In 2018 she was a panelist of Every Afternoon but was disconnected by a controversial tweet about the death of actress and conductor María Eugenia Laprida.

Politics
In April 2019 and after an intense electoral campaign and anti-abortion activism, she appeared in the Province of Santa Fe as a candidate for Provincial Representative in the elections. Her participation in the political scene had begun some time before with a party of less recognition and not getting enough percentage to acquire a position. However, after the pro-life phenomenon against the legalization of abortion in 2018, self-styled Ola Celeste (Spanish: blue wave), Granata undertook together with a group of politicians an electoral proposal with these principles and against the so-called gender ideology. In addition to various proposals of liberal and humanist court, the "Somos Vida" party of the "Unite for Life and Family" electoral front was presented on 28 April at the primary elections in Santa Fe with provincial representatives and senators and some mayors and councilors obtaining more of 140 thousand votes. In this way, Amalia Granata became the third most voted candidate, after socialism and Change.

Obtaining around 290 thousand votes, the journalist Amalia Granata, the constitutional lawyer Nicolás Mayoraz and the evangelical referent Walter Ghione along with 4 more candidates became Representatives of the Province of Santa Fe assuming 10 December 2019.

References

Living people
1981 births
21st-century Argentine politicians
Argentine female models
Argentine journalists